The Twelfth Amendment to the Constitution of Pakistan (Urdu: آئین پاکستان میں بارہویں ترمیم) was passed by the Parliament on  28 July 1991. The bill established Special Courts for the trial of heinous offenses. It also raised the salaries of the judges of the Supreme Court and the High Courts.

Amendments include addition of a new Article 212-B in the Constitution, and amendment of Fifth Schedule to the Constitution. The new article 212-B was inserted for a period of only three years and thus became ineffective in July 1994.

Text

See also
Zia-ul-Haq's Islamization
Separation of powers
Nawaz Sharif
Benazir Bhutto
Pervez Musharraf
Amendments to the Constitution of Pakistan

References

External links
Full-text of the Twelfth Amendment

01